Roger de Rolleston was a Priest in the Roman Catholic Church.

Career
Between 1174 and 1184 it is believed that Roger was a clerk to Archbishop of Canterbury Richard of Dover. In or after 1186 he was given by Archbishop of Canterbury Baldwin of Forde into the service of Bishop of Lincoln Hugh of Avalon during which time he worked with Robert de Bedford who is recorded as vice Bishop to Hugh of Avalon.

He was Archdeacon of Leicester but in 1195 he became Dean of Lincoln and Prebendary of Aylesbury.

References

Sources
 
 
 

Year of birth unknown
1223 deaths
British Roman Catholics